Boudouaou, during French colonialism known as L'Alma (or Alma) is a town in the western part of Boumerdès, Algeria.  It is a coastal town on the Mediterranean Sea. Its population in 2008 was 56,398.

The original name is thought to be bou-dhou-aou, Arabic for illuminator in reference to a small insect the size of a beetle which at night shows beautiful brilliant green light in its tail.

Archaeology

Several prehistoric vestiges were discovered during the period of occupation. With the arrival of the colonizers and the project of colonization on the lands of Boudouaou, many prehistoric vestiges under the occupation were discovered: rhinoceros bones house in the Musée de l'Homme in Paris, a bronze axe, flint Retouched and prehistoric arrows are examples of discoveries already made.

Personalities
Rachid Mimouni (An Algerian writer)

Politics
The town re-elected mayor Yahya Mahsas at the end of 2007 for 5 years, replaced by Mekki Hamoud in 2012.

Main cities
There are several villages in Boudouaou. The well known among them are:
LACACE ar لاصاص
BENADJAL ar بن عجال 
GHOUALEM  ar الغوالم
EL-NCHITE ar النشيط
BEN MERZOUGA ar بن مرزوقة
BEN YAMINA ar بن يامينة

History

French conquest

 Expedition of the Col des Beni Aïcha (1837)
 First Battle of Boudouaou (1837)
 First Battle of the Issers (1837)
 Battle of Alma (1871)

Algerian Revolution

Salafist terrorism

 2006 Boudouaou bombing (8 August 2006)

Notable people

 Ahmed Mahsas, Algerian politician and writer
 Rachid Mimouni, Algerian writer
 Walid Derrardja, Algerian footballer

References

Populated places in Boumerdès Province